Anka Muhlstein (born 1935) is a historian and biographer.

Early life
Muhlstein was born to Anatol Mühlstein and Diane de Rothschild in Paris in 1935. During World War II, she stayed in New York City before returning to France in 1945. In March 1974, she married Louis Begley, a lawyer and author, and moved back to New York with her two sons.

Career
Muhlstein has been honored twice by the French Academy's prize for history, for her biographies on her ancestor James de Rothschild, the founder of the De Rothschild Frères, and the eighteenth century explorer Cavelier de La Salle.

Muhlstein received the Goncourt prize in 1996 for biography for her work on the French writer Astolphe de Custine called A Taste for Freedom: The Life of Astolphe de Custine.  Muhlstein 's other works include Par les yeux de Marcel Proust (1971), La Femme Soleil (1976), Victoria (1978), Manhattan (1986), Reines éphémères, Mères perpétuelles (2001), Les Périls du Mariage (2004), and Napoléon à Moscou (2007).

In 2008, she and her husband Begley released Venice for Lovers, a collection of essays they individually wrote about Venice.  Her Garcon, un cent d'huîtres (Balzac's Omelet in English), a study of the role of gastronomy in the novels of Balzac, was published in 2010.

In 2017, her book, The Pen and the Brush: How Passion for Art Shaped Nineteenth-Century French Novels, was published by Other Press.

References

1935 births
Living people
Rothschild family
Prix Goncourt de la Biographie winners